John Brownlee (born in Fort Worth, Texas) is a former American professional basketball player. Brownlee played college basketball for North Carolina (1981–1983)
and Texas (1984–1986). He played professionally in France and Belgium.

College
Brownlee played his first two years of college basketball at the University of North Carolina at Chapel Hill. He played just 13 games in his freshman year, averaging 0.7 points per game. In his sophomore season, however, he played 33 games and averaged 1.3 points per game as the designated back up to center Sam Perkins as the Tar Heels won the 1981–82 NCAA Men's Basketball championship.  He then transferred to The University of Texas at Austin. He played 28 games in his third season of college basketball, averaging 13.8 points per game. In his final year, he took part in 31 games for the Longhorns and led the team in scoring with a 17.0 points per game average.  This earned him the 1986 Southwest Conference Player of the Year.

Professional career
Brownlee was selected in the fourth round (78th pick overall) of the 1986 NBA Draft by the Los Angeles Clippers.  During rookie-free agent camp, Brownlee suffered an injury when he dislocated his little finger during scrimmage. He never got his chance to play in the NBA. He then travelled overseas to France and Belgium to play professionally for 4 years.

References

External links
 TexasSports.com

Living people
Basketball players from Texas
Los Angeles Clippers draft picks
North Carolina Tar Heels men's basketball players
Parade High School All-Americans (boys' basketball)
Power forwards (basketball)
Texas Longhorns men's basketball players
Year of birth missing (living people)
Sportspeople from Fort Worth, Texas
American men's basketball players